The Nautilus Institute for Security and Sustainability is a public policy think tank founded in 1992.
The Institute convenes scholars and practitioners who conduct research to address interconnected global problems such as threats of nuclear war, urban and energy insecurity, and climate change in the Asia Pacific region.

The Institute has been mentioned in stories in media such as the Financial Times, Foreign Policy, Radio Australia, and others.

Notable associates
Simon Tay

References

External links

Political and economic think tanks in the United States
Foreign policy and strategy think tanks in the United States
Organizations established in 1992